Unilever Gloucester is a large food manufacturing site in the north-east of Gloucester, England, that produces all of the makes of Unilever ice cream for the UK.

History
The site was built by Unilever from 1959. The site was officially announced on Tuesday 16 April 1962.

Unilever is the world's largest manufacturer of ice cream, and also has large manufacturing sites in Hellendoorn in the Netherlands, Saint-Dizier in France and Caivano in Italy. Nestle and Unilever have about a third of the global production each.

The site was built to supply 25 million people in the west and north of England, and Wales. In the 1960s the site had over 1,000 employees, and was the world's largest ice cream factory. When opening, the site could produce 90,000 gallons of ice cream a day and 2 million lollies a day.

Over five years in the late 1980s, £60m was invested on the site.

Visits
In March 1995, the site was visited by the Queen and the Duke of Edinburgh; the Queen had visited the nearby GCHQ site (in the west of Cheltenham) at 10.30am, and she planted a commemorative tree at the Unilever factory.

Structure
In the 1960s there was a two story office and production buildings, and a cone and wafer factory called Embisco. The site was opened as the Cotswold Factory.

The site runs 24 hours a day, all week.  The site is situated on the A417, to the west of the large A40 roundabout. It is around a mile west of junction 11a of the M5, and situated to the east of the main Cross Country Route railway.

The site employs over 500 people.

Production
The site makes around 
5m Cornetto products and about 10m Magnum products a week. It makes around 1.5 billion ice cream products a year.

See also
 Arla Aylesbury
 Fruit and Vegetable Preservation Research Station, also in Gloucestershire
 Company Profile, Dun and Bradstreet
 Company Profile - Bloomberg

References

External links
 Unilever UK

1959 establishments in England
Buildings and structures in Gloucester
Companies based in Gloucester
Dairy products companies of the United Kingdom
Food manufacturers of England
Ice cream
Industrial buildings completed in 1962
Manufacturing plants in England
Unilever